Franz Schubert composed his Rondo in B minor for violin and piano, D 895 in 1826 for the twenty-year-old Czech violinist Josef Slavik (who also commissioned Schubert's Fantasy in C, D 934 in 1827). It was the first piece for violin and piano that Schubert had composed for almost a decade. It was first performed by Slavík with the pianist Karl Maria von Bocklet in 1827. Artaria published the score in April 1827 as "Rondo brilliant, Op. 70". The Rondo is the only one of Schubert's six violin-piano works to reach print during his lifetime.

Structure 
The composition starts with an introductory "Andante", followed by an "Allegro" (A-B-A-C-A). The ensuing coda contains reminiscences of the theme of the "Andante" and of the "B" episode of the "Allegro". It ends in a section marked "Più mosso" in the score, in B major.

References 
Notes

Sources

External links 

Chamber music by Franz Schubert
Compositions for violin and piano
1826 compositions
Compositions in B minor